In Greek mythology, Cerberus (Ancient Greek: Κέρβερος Kérberos ) may refer to a character and a mythical canine:

 Cerberus, one of the Suitors of Penelope who came from Same along with other 22 wooers. He, with the other suitors, was shot dead by Odysseus with the assistance of Eumaeus, Philoetius, and Telemachus.
 Cerberus, the three-headed hound of the Underworld.
 Cerberus, a Cretan man who along with three others (Aegolius, Celeus and Laius) attempted to steal honey from the sacred cave in Crete, where Zeus had been brought up. Zeus intended to kill them for the insolence, but because the cave was sacred, he turned them into birds; Cerberus became a kerberos, an unidentified species of bird.

Notes

References 
 Antoninus Liberalis, The Metamorphoses of Antoninus Liberalis translated by Francis Celoria (Routledge 1992). Online version at the Topos Text Project.
 Apollodorus, The Library with an English Translation by Sir James George Frazer, F.B.A., F.R.S. in 2 Volumes, Cambridge, MA, Harvard University Press; London, William Heinemann Ltd. 1921. ISBN 0-674-99135-4. Online version at the Perseus Digital Library. Greek text available from the same website.
 Hesiod, Theogony from The Homeric Hymns and Homerica with an English Translation by Hugh G. Evelyn-White, Cambridge, MA.,Harvard University Press; London, William Heinemann Ltd. 1914. Online version at the Perseus Digital Library. Greek text available from the same website.

Suitors of Penelope
Cretan characters in Greek mythology
Deeds of Zeus
Metamorphoses into birds in Greek mythology